The Phetchaburi River is a river in western Thailand. It has its source in the Tenasserim Hills, in the Kaeng Krachan National Park, Kaeng Krachan district and flows through Tha Yang, Ban Lat, Mueang Phetchaburi and mouths into the Bay of Bangkok in Ban Laem district. It is the backbone of this province.

In addition, the water in this river was used in the coronation ceremony of the Thai Kings in each reign.

Rivers of Thailand